Karl Haendel, (born 1976, New York City) is an American artist who lives and works in Los Angeles, California. Haendel is represented by Vielmetter Los Angeles, Mitchell-Innes & Nash, New York and Wentrup Gallery, Berlin.

Education

Haendel received a bachelor's degree in Art Semiotics and Art History from Brown University in 1998. He attended the Whitney Museum Independent Study Program and the Skowhegan School of Painting and Sculpture in 1999 and 2000 respectively. He received a Master of Fine Arts degree from the University of California Los Angeles in 2003 where he studied with John Baldessari, Mary Kelly, and Paul McCarthy.

Work

Haendel's practice focuses on the appropriation and recontextualization of visual signifiers through photorealistic drawing. His drawings, while often direct copies of photographs, are also composed at a markedly larger scale; transforming the quickness of composing a photograph with the manual labor required to produce drawings that often exceed 10 feet. Removing images from the original context, Haendel presents a new visual language and criticism on contemporary sociocultural relationships. "Though his work may cause us to debate the value of the original versus the copy, Haendel prefers not to situate his work on that familiar ground. Instead, he focuses on how a chain of iteration..." He “appropriates, copies, and re-makes images into new representations,” to “engage the long process of language building.”
 
Haendel describes his role as an artist to “honestly present a vision of the world that he…believes to be true.” For Haendel, this conviction is the ethical underpinning of his practice. He defines himself in opposition to “the social artist, who cannot see how his identity is produced.”

Exhibitions

Haendel has been included in exhibitions at the Museum of Modern Art, NY; the New Museum, NY; and the Guggenheim Museum, NY. His works are included in the public collections of the Museum of Contemporary Art, Los Angeles, LA; The Museum of Modern Art, New York, NY; and the Guggenheim Museum, New York, NY.

Two years after graduating from UCLA, Haendel had a solo exhibition at the Museum of Contemporary Art, Los Angeles in 2005. David Pagel described Haendel's work in this exhibition as that of a “detached observer, an armchair sociologist more interested in pointing out the irrationality of society's crass values than in risking failure to shake things up.”  In a later review of the show, Jody Zellen described Haendel as a “smart artist.” “He has the skills as well as the know how to make intelligent, beautiful, and well-designed works of art...He appropriates the strategies of appropriation and installation, while also acknowledging conceptualism, minimalism, and the power of political art.”

Haendel was also included in the 2004 and 2008 California Biennials at the Orange County Museum of Art and Prospect II, New Orleans in 2011.

In 2010, Haendel was commissioned to design an installation for the lobby of the Lever House. The installation featured his “signature, stunning graphite drawings on paper--one series depicting cracked light bulbs, mirrors, and eggs; another, the fortunes from fortune cookies; another, abstractions that riff on Mondrian’s “Boogie-Woogie” series—all of which covered two 20-foot-long walls that cross the building's famed glass lobby.”

In 2011 Haendel exhibited his first film, “Questions for my father,” made in collaboration with filmmaker Petter Ringbom. The film “evolved from a series of large graphite word-drawings of the same title that Mr. Haendel...directed at his own father.” The film features 16 men in their 30s and early 40s, including the artist and filmmaker. “Each man makes repeat appearances, looking directly into the camera and asking a short, pithy question that, it doesn’t take long to realize, are intended for the speaker’s absent male parent. The questions imply a full-spectrum of emotions, from tenderness to curiosity to anger, and speak volumes about one of the most primal of relationships.” The film was shown in 2012 The Box Theater at the Wexner Center for the Arts and the Utah Museum of Contemporary Art.

In 2013, Haendel produced a new installation, “People Who Don’t Know They’re Dead,” for the 12th Biennale de Lyon, Lyon, France, curated by Gunnar B. Kvaran. The installation is made up of approximately 60 drawings which focus on themes of gun violence, sexual difference, technological fetishism, and power structures.

Haendel was included in the 2015 Biennial of the Americas, Museum of Contemporary Art, Denver; the 2014 Whitney Biennial, Whitney Museum of American Art, New York; the 12th Biennale de Lyon in 2013; and Prospect II, New Orleans in 2011.

Haendel has been included in numerous exhibitions on contemporary drawing at the Drawing Room, London, UK  and Modern Art Oxford, Oxford, UK, both in 2018.

Public projects

In 2023, Haendel will inaugurate a work at the entry of the Wilshire/Fairfax station for Metro Art LA, the Los Angeles Metro Rail public art program. In 2009 Haendel was commission by the Art Production Fund to create a large-scale mural at 441 Broadway in SoHo, New York City. This large public project was the first iteration of his “Scribble” murals, which later appeared on the facade of LAXART in Los Angeles, California.

Haendel also produced several billboard projects featuring reproductions of his drawings,  as well as text and language-based murals.

Critical response

Early in his career, most critics focused on Haendel's ties to the lineage of the 1980s; appropriation art and the conceptual underpinnings of the Pictures generation in particular.  However, recent criticism has focused more on questions of labor and value, the play of language, the complexity of ethics,  and the intersection of the personal with the political. In particular, David Frankel's 2011 Artforum review of “Questions for My Father,” highlights the artist's interest in the emotional ramifications of social and political structures, noting that “politics, sexuality, household habits, finances--nothing is off the table here…[while] the master’s voice is absent.”

Most recently, Art Journal has published several articles in 2016 investigating Haendel's different modes and models of appropriation in the legacy of the postmodernist strategy and its reception.

Collections

Haendel’s work can be found in the permanent collections of the Art Gallery of Ontario; Colección Jumex; Deutsche Bank Collection; Solomon R. Guggenheim Museum; Hammer Museum; Kunsthalle Bielefeld;  Los Angeles County Museum of Art; Museum of Contemporary Art, Los Angeles; Museum of Modern Art; the Whitney Museum of American Art, among others.

References

External links
 Karl Haendel at Kadist Art Foundation
 Karl Haendel Kapsul Image Collection
Karl Haendel at  Sommer Contemporary Art

Artists from New York City
1976 births
Living people
American installation artists